Lur, in Iran, may refer to:
 Lur, Gilan
 Lur, Hormozgan
 Lur, West Azerbaijan